Amroli is a suburb in around  Surat state of gujarat in India. The nearest airport is surat airport.

Geography  
The city is located at an average elevation of 12 metres (66 feet).

Demographics
 India census, Amroli had a population of 32457. Males constitute 63% of the population and females 38%. Amroli has an average literacy rate of 74%, higher than the national average of 59.5%: male literacy is 81%, and female literacy is 63%. In Amroli, 14% of the population is under 6 years of age.

Transport 
By road: Amroli is in Surat
By air: Nearest airport is Surat which is 19 km (12 miles) from Amroli.

See also 

Surat
List of tourist attractions in Surat

References

Suburban area of Surat
Neighbourhoods in Surat